Modestas Vaičiulis (born 11 April 1989) is a Lithuanian cross-country skier since 2007. At the 2010 Winter Olympics in Vancouver, he finished 18th in the team sprint and 54th in the individual sprint events. Vaičiulius returned to represent Lithuania at the 2018 Winter Olympics, where he finished 44th in individual sprint and 24th in team sprint.

Vaičiulis finished 49th in the sprint event at the FIS Nordic World Ski Championships 2009 in Liberec.

His best World Cup finish was 28th in a sprint event in Dresden in 2020.

References

1989 births
Cross-country skiers at the 2010 Winter Olympics
Cross-country skiers at the 2018 Winter Olympics
Cross-country skiers at the 2022 Winter Olympics
Lithuanian male cross-country skiers
Living people
Olympic cross-country skiers of Lithuania